Michael Gracey is an Australian filmmaker and visual effects artist best known for directing The Greatest Showman.

Early life and career
Gracey grew up in Melbourne – in Carlton then Kew – then started working in visual effects and music videos before making his reputation in advertising, gaining a name for with his Christmas commercials in the UK and US.

Career
Gracey made his feature directorial debut in 2017 with The Greatest Showman starring Hugh Jackman as P. T. Barnum.

Gracey is also slated to direct an adaptation of manga series Naruto and an adaptation of the novel Daughter of Smoke and Bone. Gracey worked for 2 years at animation and visual effects studio Animal Logic from 1994 to 1996 as an animator and visual effects compositor.

In 2022, Gracey directed a short film for Tourism Australia, G'Day, starring Rose Byrne and Will Arnett, with cameos from Hamish Blake & Andy Lee. The commercial is the salient feature of the 'Come and Say G’day' campaign.

Gracey is a member of the Australian production company: FINCH.

Filmography

Film

Television

References

External links

Profile at Partizan production company
 Profile at Moth Projects

Australian film directors
Living people
Year of birth missing (living people)